The solo discography of Belinda Carlisle, an American pop singer, contains eight studio albums, eleven compilations, two retrospective box sets and four video albums. Her singles discography features thirty-two physical releases – three of which she has recorded as a guest artist –, five digital-only and five promotional releases. She has also made nine other appearances and thirty-one music videos.

Carlisle's first solo album Belinda was released in 1986 on I.R.S. Records and was certified gold in the United States and platinum in Canada. Her first single, "Mad About You", peaked at number three in the US, topped the Canadian Singles Chart, and charted on the top 10 in Australia. The song was followed by "I Feel the Magic" and by a cover version of the Freda Payne song "Band of Gold". Carlisle's second album Heaven on Earth was released in 1987 through MCA and became a Top 5 bestseller in the United Kingdom and Australia. The first single release became "Heaven Is a Place on Earth", which topped the single charts in many countries including US and UK. The second single from the album was "I Get Weak", which shot to number two in the States and number ten in the U.K.. Third single, "Circle in the Sand" was another Top 10 hit in the US, UK and Germany. Other singles releases included, "World Without You", "Love Never Dies" and "I Feel Free".

The follow-up album Runaway Horses was released in 1989 and hit the Top 5 in both Australia and UK. The first single release "Leave a Light On", it became another Top 5 smash in the UK, Australia and Canada. Other singles were "Summer Rain", the summer mood influenced "La Luna" and "(We Want) The Same Thing". In 1991 Carlisle issued her fourth album, Live Your Life Be Free featuring such singles as"Half the World", "Little Black Book" and "Do You Feel Like I Feel". In 1992 she released her first greatest hits album The Best of Belinda, Volume 1 which reached number one in the UK and was certified double platinum and platinum in Australia.

Real was released in 1993 and debuted in the top ten in the UK. Singles of the album featured "Big Scary Animal" and "Lay Down Your Arms", a remake from the Graces. Three years later she released A Woman & a Man which included "In Too Deep". The song returned Carlisle to the UK Top 10 for the first time in six years, reaching number six. The song also made the top 20 in Australia (number 11). The second single release was "Always Breaking My Heart" which also made it into the UK Top 10, peaking at number eight. The album spawned two more singles: "Love in the Key of C" and "California". In 1999 the singer released a second greatest hits album in the UK entitled A Place on Earth: The Greatest Hits, and was certified gold in the UK. In 2007 Carlisle released Voilà, consisting of a mix of French pop tunes and chanson standards, including covers of Françoise Hardy and Édith Piaf classics.

In 2013, she released the single "Sun" to coincide with a new budget compilation in the US. A new career retrospective, The Collection, was released in March 2014, reaching number 24 in the UK along with a new single "Goodbye Just Go".

Albums

Studio albums

Compilation albums

Live albums

Box sets

Extended Plays

Singles

Guest singles

Promotional singles

Other appearances

Videos

Video albums

Music videos

References 

Discographies of American artists
Pop music discographies